Megan Henwood (born 29 October 1987) is an English singer-songwriter from Oxfordshire.

Early life
Born Megan Rosemary Henwood in Reading, Berkshire, England, Henwood grew up in Henley-on-Thames, Oxfordshire. Her first public performance was at the age of 9 at the Henley Youth Festival. As a teenager she performed both as a solo artist and with her band on the local live circuit. At the age of 18, she travelled around Europe, Thailand, India, Malaysia, and Nepal – returning to the latter twice to record and perform with some of the country's musicians.  She has since supported the London-based Child Action Nepal charity by donating profit from record sales.

Career
Henwood has contributed to music therapy sessions and in 2010 she was awarded a Sue Ryder Care "Woman of Achievement" award as Performer of the Year.

In 2009, Henwood – along with her saxophonist brother Joe – won the BBC Radio 2 Young Folk Award. She has performed at events such as the Cambridge Folk Festival, and Fairport's Cropredy Convention, and performed at Glastonbury Festival 2010.

Her first album, Making Waves, was released on 4 July 2011 on Dharma Records, ahead of various festival appearances including Larmer Tree, Cambridge Folk Festival and Secret Garden Party. The album features musicians such as Peter Knight, Andy Crowdy, Joe Brown, Sam Brown, Mollie Marriott, Barriemore Barlow and Nick Fyffe.

Her second album "Head Heart Hand" was released in July 2015. The album was produced by Tom Excell and featured Pete Thomas, Matthew Holborn, Matthew Forbes, Rich Milner, Jackie Oates, Tom Sibley, Sam Wilkinson, Tom Michell and Steve Jones. Singles from the album were featured on various BBC Radio 2 shows and Henwood performed a live session on The Folk Show with Mark Radcliffe. The video for Love/Loathe, the first single from the album, was premiered on The Telegraph in May 2015.

Henwood's third album, "River" was released in the Autumn of 2017. Working again with producer Tom Excell, she experimented with a more electronic sound, contrasting from her last two acoustic releases. The album was praised by The Guardian who described it as 'a worldly, mature work'.

She has written with/for a number of artists including Brother Strut and has been commissioned as a songwriter for Arts Council England and Shakespeare Birthplace Trust.

Discography

Albums
 Making Waves (2011)
 Head Heart Hand (2015)
 River (2017)

EPs
 Wings (2016) – with Jackie Oates
 Unplugged EP (2017)
 The Story Song Scientists EP (2019) – with Findlay Napier

Featured artist
 "Blind Eye" (Track 4) on the album First Strut Is The Deepest (2013) by Brother Strut

References

External links
 

1987 births
Living people
English women singer-songwriters
21st-century English women singers
21st-century English singers